Brownsville Area High School is a small, rural public high school serving students in southwestern Pennsylvania, near the Monongahela River. It serves students living in the Borough of Brownsville and Brownsville Township, Luzerne Township and Redstone Township in Fayette County. In Washington County, Pennsylvania it serves the Borough of West Brownsville. In the 2017–2018 school year, enrollment was reported as 471.

Brownsville Area High School students may choose to attend the Fayette County Career and Technical Institute for training in the construction and mechanical trades. Fayette County Career and Technical Institute is located in Georges Township. Students attend for one-half day, each day while attending their home school the other half of the school day. The school offers driver's education classes and dual enrollment courses in cooperation with Westmoreland County Community College.

The Intermediate Unit IU1 provides the district with a wide variety of services like specialized education for disabled students and hearing, background checks for employees, state mandated recognizing and reporting child abuse training, speech and visual disability services and criminal background check processing for prospective employees and professional development for staff and faculty.

Creation and history
Brownsville Area High School was constructed in the mid-1960s to accommodate students in the newly created Brownsville Area School District, which resulted in the consolidation of the Redstone Township, Luzerne Township, and Brashear High Schools. There was an addition in 1972. The school district closed Redstone Middle School in 2001 and moved the students to the High School until a $17 Million Addition/Renovation process was completed in 2005, at which time the Middle School was placed into its separate facility.

Extracurriculars
Brownsville Area High School offers a variety of clubs, activities and an extensive, publicly funded, sports program.

Athletics

According to PIAA directory July 2015

Notable alumni
Doug Dascenzo – Retired MLB outfielder
Ed Roebuck – Retired MLB pitcher
Vinnie Colaiuta – Famous Rock Drummer

References

Public high schools in Pennsylvania
Schools in Fayette County, Pennsylvania
Educational institutions established in 1966
1966 establishments in Pennsylvania